Robert Marcel Charles Benoist (20 March 1895 – 14 September 1944) was a French Grand Prix motor racing driver and war hero.

Early life
Born near Rambouillet, Île-de-France, France, Robert Benoist was the son of Baron Henri de Rothschild's gamekeeper. As a young man, Benoist served during World War I in the French infantry, then as a fighter pilot in the new Armée de l'Air and ultimately as a flying instructor.

Grand Prix driver

Looking for excitement in the post-war world, Benoist joined the de Marçay car company as a test driver. He then moved on to Salmson and was very successful in cyclecar races before being signed to drive for Delage in 1924. The next year, teamed with Albert Divo, he won the French Grand Prix in the race that claimed the life of Italian racing star Antonio Ascari.

In 1927, driving a Delage 15-S-8, he won the French, Spanish, Italian and British Grand Prix races, earning the season championship title for the French manufacturer.

When the Delage company dropped out of racing, Robert Benoist was without a job and was appointed manager of the Banville Garage in Paris. He did occasional races for the Bugatti team, finishing second in the 1928 San Sebastián Grand Prix in Spain.

The following year he teamed up with Attilio Marinoni to win the Spa 24 Hours race in Belgium, driving an Alfa Romeo. At the end of the season he retired until 1934, when he made a comeback with the Bugatti team. He was soon made head of the competition department and masterminded the company's Le Mans programme. In 1937 he partnered with Jean-Pierre Wimille to win the 24 Hours of Le Mans endurance race. Following that victory, Benoist retired permanently, but continued to run Bugatti's racing department until called up into the French Air Force.

World War II
In addition to Jean-Pierre Wimille, Robert Benoist became good friends with another Grand Prix driver, William Grover-Williams. When World War II broke out and France was occupied, these three race drivers all escaped to Britain where they joined the Special Operations Executive as secret agents to return to France to assist the French Resistance. Benoist was commissioned into the British Army as a captain. Parachuted into France, Benoist helped organise sabotage cells and with William Grover-Williams moved weapons from air-drops in the Rambouillet forest to his home at Auffargis for storage and distribution.

In June 1943, the "Prosper" network in Paris collapsed and its leaders, Francis Suttill and Andrée Borrel, were arrested by the Gestapo. In August, Benoist's home was raided by the Gestapo and Grover-Williams was captured and executed with Francis Suttill at the Sachsenhausen concentration camp.

Capture and escape
Three days later, Robert Benoist was apprehended in Paris. While being driven to Gestapo headquarters, Benoist leaped from the moving vehicle and escaped, eventually being smuggled back to Britain via the underground.

New missions
Benoist returned to France on a second mission, lasting from October 1943 to February 1944, after which he returned to London for a short time before going back to France in March to work in the Nantes area with fellow SOE agent Denise Bloch.

Benoist was arrested on 18 June 1944 and shipped to Buchenwald concentration camp where he was executed three months later, on 14 September.

Legacy
Following Germany's surrender, on 9 September 1945, the "Coupe Robert Benoist" automobile race was held in Paris in his memory.

Captain Robert Benoist is recorded on the Brookwood Memorial in Surrey, Britain, and as one of the SOE agents who died for the liberation of France, he is listed on the "Roll of Honor" on the Valençay SOE Memorial in the town of Valençay, in the Indre  of France.

In his honour, the village of Auffargis named a street after him and it is there in the churchyard cemetery on "Allée Robert Benoist" that fellow pioneer race driver, Ferenc Szisz is buried.  Among the remaining grandstands still standing at the former Reims-Gueux circuit in France is one named "Tribune Robert Benoist".

Racing record

Complete 24 Hours of Le Mans results

Bibliography
Au volant: Cours pratique de conduite automobile, Bernard-Précy, Robert Benoist, Paris, Ed. Tallandier 1933
 Foot, MRD: SOE in France (HMSO, London 1966)
 Ryan Robert: Early One Morning, Headline 2002 
 Pernod Alain: Grand Prix de France : Un siècle en histoires, ed. ETAI, 2006, 
 Saward, Joe: "The Grand Prix Saboteurs", Morienval Press, London, 2006, 
 Motor Sport, August 1945, Page 156.

References

1895 births
1944 deaths
French military personnel of World War I
French racing drivers
24 Hours of Le Mans drivers
24 Hours of Spa drivers
24 Hours of Le Mans winning drivers
Executed spies
French Resistance members
French people who died in Buchenwald concentration camp
Resistance members who died in Nazi concentration camps
British Army General List officers
British Army personnel killed in World War II
People from Rambouillet
French people executed in Nazi concentration camps
Executed people from Île-de-France
French Special Operations Executive personnel
Sportspeople from Yvelines
European Championship drivers